Polikraishte (also transcribed as Polikrayshte) is a village (село) in northern Bulgaria, located in the Gorna Oryahovitsa municipality of the Veliko Tarnovo Province.

References

Villages in Veliko Tarnovo Province